The Oberburg at Kobern, also called the Oberburg or Altenburg, is a hill castle above the municipality of Kobern-Gondorf in the county of Mayen-Koblenz in the German state of Rhineland-Palatinate.

Location 

The ruins of the Oberburg ("Upper Castle") stand at a height of about 200 metres above the village of Kobern on a hill ridge that points towards the Moselle. On the same ridge and about 50 metres lower, is the Niederburg ("Lower Castle").

Description 
Apart from the Late Romanesque St. Matthias' Chapel and the bergfried little other than a few remains of the enceinte have survived. The castle has a rectangular ground plan and measures about 110 by 40 metres. The ground and upper storey of the roughly 9 by 9 metre, square bergfried are vaulted. Access to the second floor is via a staircase in the wall.

The building attached to the bergfried was built in 1989.

History 
The castle was built in the early 12th century on a Celtic hillfort site. It is first recorded in 1195, when the then Burgherr made it a fiefdom of the Electorate of Trier.

St. Matthias' Chapel was built about 1220/40 by Lord Henry II of Isenburg, in order to serve as a reliquary for the head of Saint Matthias. The castle area was increased in size when the chapel was built. It used the choir of a previous structure, which was probably not finished.

The lords of Isenburg-Kobern held the castle until the mid-14th century. It was then sold to the Archbishop of Trier and fell into ruin.

In 1936, the bergfried was covered by an temporary roof to protect it from further decay. From 1989, a restaurant was built next to the bergfried on a site that had been built on before. As part of the work, the bergfried was increased in height and given a new roof.

Visiting 
The castle is open to the public all year round and may be visited free of charge. There is a restaurant in the bergfried and adjacent buildings. St. Matthias' Chapel can be visited at summer weekends. There is an ascent to the castle up a narrow footpath, the Kreuzweg, through the vineyards, from the Mühlbach valley. There is also a car par immediately below the castle.

Protected monument 
The Oberburg is a protected cultural monument.

References

Literature 
 Alexander Thon, Stefan Ulrich: „Von den Schauern der Vorwelt umweht ...“ Burgen und Schlösser an der Mosel. 1st edition, Verlag Schnell & Steiner, Regensburg, 2007, pp. 86–91.
 Landesamt für Denkmalpflege - Burgen, Schlösser, Altertümer Rheinland-Pfalz (publ.), Führer der staatlichen Schlösserverwaltung des Landesamtes für Denkmalpflege Rheinland-Pfalz, Führungsheft 7,  Mainz, 1999.
 Ortsgemeinde Kobern-Gondorf (Hrsg.): Kobern-Gondorf. 1980.

External links 

 
 Artist's impression by Wolfgang Braun

Castles in Rhineland-Palatinate
Kobern, Niederburg
Heritage sites in Rhineland-Palatinate
Kobern, Niederburg
+Niederburg Kobern
12th-century architecture